Suncake may refer to:
Suncake (Taiwan),  a popular Taiwanese dessert originally from the city of Taichung in Taiwan
Suncake (Beijing), a dessert in Beijing cuisine